Shin Myung-chul (Hangul: 신명철, Hanja: 申命澈; born August 6, 1978, in Masan, South Korea) is a second baseman who plays for the KT Wiz in the Korea Baseball Organization. He bats and throws right-handed.

Amateur career
Upon graduation from high school in 1997, he chose to play college baseball at Yonsei University instead of turning pro directly. In July 1997, as a freshman Shin was selected to play for South Korea in the 8th Korea–USA College Baseball Championship Series. Team Korea eventually had a record of 2–3 and Shin played in all five games as a starting second baseman.

In April 1998, Yonsei University captured the 32nd President's Flag College Championship, and Shin dominated the competition by winning the batting and stolen base titles and earning the MVP honors. Shin spent much of the summer of 1998 overseas with the South Korean national team, taking part in a tour of Japan and United States and competing in the Baseball World Cup held in Italy. In December 1998, he was selected for the South Korea national team again that finished in 1st place at the 1998 Asian Games in Bangkok, Thailand.

Notable international careers

Professional career
Shin started his professional career in Lotte Giants in 2001, but was traded to Samsung Lions in 2007.

In the 2009 season, Shin currently has a .293 batting average with 120 hits.

He joined the 20–20 club with 20 home runs and 21 stolen bases in 2009 with a 2-run on September 23, 2009, against SK Wyverns.

External links
Career statistics and player information from Korea Baseball Organization

1978 births
Asian Games gold medalists for South Korea
Asian Games medalists in baseball
Baseball players at the 1998 Asian Games
KBO League second basemen
KT Wiz players
Living people
Lotte Giants players
Medalists at the 1998 Asian Games
People from Changwon
Samsung Lions players
South Korean baseball players
Yonsei University alumni
Sportspeople from South Gyeongsang Province